Linda Cerup-Simonsen (born as Linda Andersen on 15 June 1969) is a Norwegian sailor.

She was born in Tønsberg. She competed in the 1992 Summer Olympics in Barcelona, where she won gold medal in the Europe Class. She also competed in the 1996 Summer Olympics in Atlanta.

She obtained silver medals in the World Championships in 1988 and 1989. In the 1991 European Championships she won gold medal, and a bronze medal in 1992.

She is a sister of Ida Andersen.

References

External links
 

1969 births
Norwegian female sailors (sport)
Sportspeople from Tønsberg
Sailors at the 1992 Summer Olympics – Europe
Sailors at the 1996 Summer Olympics – 470
Olympic sailors of Norway
Olympic gold medalists for Norway
Living people
Olympic medalists in sailing

Medalists at the 1992 Summer Olympics